Ricardo Primitivo González (born 12 May 1925) is an Argentine former basketball player. In 1980, he received the Konex Merit Diploma, being named one of the 5 best Argentine players of all-time to that point. He was inducted into the FIBA Hall of Fame, in 2009.

Club career
During his club basketball playing career, González played with the Argentine teams Santos Lugares and Club Atlético Palermo, one of the oldest clubs in Palermo.

National team career
With the senior Argentine national basketball team, González played at the 1947 FIBA South American Championship, the 1949 FIBA South American Championship, and the 1955 FIBA South American Championship. He also competed with Argentina at the 1948 Summer Olympics and the 1952 Summer Olympics. He was the team captain of the senior Argentine national team that won the gold medal at the 1950 FIBA World Championship. He was named to the 1950 FIBA World Championship's All-Tournament Team. He also won silver medals at the 1951 Pan American Games, and the 1955 Pan American Games.

References

External links
FIBA Profile 1
FIBA Profile 2
FIBA Hall of Fame Profile
Sports-Reference.com Profile
El Negro lo merece 

Living people
1925 births
Argentine men's basketball players
Basketball players at the 1948 Summer Olympics
Basketball players at the 1951 Pan American Games
Basketball players at the 1952 Summer Olympics
Basketball players at the 1955 Pan American Games
FIBA Hall of Fame inductees
FIBA World Championship-winning players
Pan American Games medalists in basketball
Pan American Games silver medalists for Argentina
Olympic basketball players of Argentina
Shooting guards
Medalists at the 1951 Pan American Games
Medalists at the 1955 Pan American Games
1950 FIBA World Championship players
Basketball players from Buenos Aires